The following Union Army units and commanders fought in the Battle of Bentonville of the American Civil War. The Confederate order of battle is shown separately.

Abbreviations used

Military rank
 MG = Major General
 BG = Brigadier General
 Col = Colonel
 Ltc = Lieutenant Colonel
 Maj = Major
 Cpt = Captain
 Lt = Lieutenant
 Bvt = Brevet

Other
 w = wounded

Grand Army of the West
MG William T. Sherman, commanding

Headquarters Guard
7th Company, Ohio Sharpshooters

Engineers and Mechanics
1st Michigan: Col John B. Yates
1st Missouri (five companies)

Right Wing (Army of the Tennessee)

MG Oliver O. Howard

Escort
15th Illinois Cavalry

Pontoon Train Guard
14th Wisconsin, Company E

XV Corps

MG John A. Logan

XVII Corps

MG Francis Preston Blair, Jr.

Escort
11th Illinois Cavalry (Company G)

Left Wing (Army of Georgia, recently the Army of the Cumberland)

MG Henry W. Slocum

Staff:
 Chief engineer: Lt William Ludlow

Pontoniers
58th Indiana

XIV Corps

Bvt MG Jefferson C. Davis

Staff:
 Chief of Staff Ltc Alexander C. McClurg
 Inspector General: Ltc Henry G. Litchfield

XX Corps

Bvt MG Alpheus S. Williams

Cavalry

References

Sources
 Bentonville Battlefield website
 Bradley, Mark L. Last Stand in the Carolinas: The Battle of Bentonville. Campbell, California: Savas Publishing Company, 1996. .

American Civil War orders of battle
Battle of Bentonville